is a railway station on the Kyushu Shinkansen in Tamana, Kumamoto, Japan, operated by the Kyushu Railway Company (JR Kyushu). The station opened on March 12, 2011.

Lines 
Shin-Tamana Station is served by Tsubame stopping services, but a small number of limited-stop direct Sakura services to and from  also stop here.

Layout

The station has two opposed side platforms, serving two tracks.

Platforms 

From October 2015, JR Kyushu plans to remove platform operating staff from the station as a cost-cutting exercise. This will become the first shinkansen station to operate without staff present on the platforms. This is possible due to the relatively straight platforms and the low passenger usage figures of around 1,000 passengers daily.

History
The station opened on 12 March 2011, coinciding with the opening of the first section of the Kyushu Shinkansen between Hakata and Shin-Yatsushiro.

Surrounding area
 Kyushu University of Nursing and Social Welfare
  National Route 208

See also
 List of railway stations in Japan

References

External links

 JR Kyushu - Shin-Tamana Station 

 

Stations of Kyushu Railway Company
Railway stations in Kumamoto Prefecture
Railway stations in Japan opened in 2011